These are the election results of the 1959 Malayan general election by parliamentary constituency. These members of parliament (MPs) representing their constituency from the first sitting of 1st Malaysian Parliament to its dissolution.

Perlis

Kedah

Kelantan

Trengganu

Penang

References 

General elections in Malaysia
1959 elections in Malaya
Election results in Malaysia